CEO Exchange is a television program featuring conversations between the host and two CEO guests, often from related industries. It is hosted by Jeff Greenfield of CNN. The show was distributed by WTTW to public television stations. It aired from 2000 to 2006.

Except for the shows taped during a short third season, the interviews are recorded in front of audiences at business schools in the United States. Students and other guests are allowed to ask questions at certain points of the program.

Schools featured in previous broadcasts include:
University of Washington Business School
Columbia Business School
The Wharton School of the University of Pennsylvania
UCLA Anderson School of Management
McCombs School of Business at The University of Texas at Austin 
Kellogg School of Management at Northwestern University
Howard University School of Business
Fordham University Graduate School of Business Administration
Rutgers Business School
Robert H. Smith School of Business at the University of Maryland, College Park
University of Michigan Business School
Haas School of Business at the University of California, Berkeley
Stanford Graduate School of Business
University of Southern California Marshall School of Business
Fuqua School of Business at Duke University
London Business School
Johnson Graduate School of Management at Cornell University
University of Chicago Graduate School of Business

Reference list 
CEO Exchange

CEO Exchange TV series

CNN

Jeff Greenfield

WTTW

References

External links
 
 CEO Exchange Website

PBS original programming
Business-related television series
Television series by WTTW
2000 American television series debuts
2006 American television series endings